Eutaxia cuneata is a species of flowering plant in the family Fabaceae and is endemic to the south-west of Western Australia. It is a slender, upright shrub with red and orange  pea-like flowers.

Description

Taxonomy and naming
Eutaxia cuneata was first formally described in 1844 and the description was published in Plantae Preissianae. The specific epithet (cuneata) means "wedge-shaped", usually refers to the leaves.

Distribution and habitat
This pea grows in heath, woodland in a variety of soils near the south coast of Western Australia from Cheyne Beach to Ravensthorpe.

References

cuneata
Fabales of Australia
Rosids of Western Australia
Plants described in 1844